Still Grippin' tha Grain: The Best Of is the best of album by southern rap duo YoungBloodZ. It was released on November 21, 2006.

Track listing
"YoungBloodZ Intro/6P's" (Interlude)
"Presidential"
"Cadillac Pimpin'"
"Damn!" (featuring Lil Jon)
"Mind on My Money" (featuring Jazze Pha)
"85/Billy Dee" (Interlude) (featuring Big Boi)
"Shakem' Off" Produced By Attic Crew Productions & Montez Harris - Front Street Entertainment
"Chop Chop"
"U-Way" (How We Do It)
"Datz Me" (featuring Young Buck)
"Tequila"
"Hustle" (featuring Killer Mike)
"Lean Low" (featuring Backbone)
"Ev'rbody Know Me" (Bonus Track)

YoungBloodZ albums
2006 greatest hits albums
LaFace Records albums
Epic Records albums